Horace Bastings (1831–1909) was a 19th-century Member of Parliament from the Southland region of New Zealand.

From November 1872 to May 1874, and from May to June 1875, he served on the Executive Council of the Otago Province.

References

1831 births
1909 deaths
New Zealand MPs for South Island electorates
Members of the New Zealand House of Representatives
Unsuccessful candidates in the 1881 New Zealand general election
Members of Otago provincial executive councils
19th-century New Zealand politicians